The 1955 Pro Bowl was the National Football League's (NFL) fifth annual all-star game which featured the league's outstanding performers from the 1954 season. The game was played on January 16, 1955, at the Los Angeles Memorial Coliseum in Los Angeles, California, in front of 42,972 fans. The West squad defeated the East by a score of 26–19.

The West team was led by Buck Shaw (although he had recently been fired by the San Francisco 49ers) while Jim Trimble of the Philadelphia Eagles coached the East squad. 49ers end Billy Wilson was unanimously selected as the game's outstanding player.

References

External links

Pro Bowl
Pro Bowl
Pro Bowl
Pro Bowl
1955 in Los Angeles
National Football League in Los Angeles
January 1955 sports events in the United States